Political party Lithuanian List is a political party in Lithuania. Since the Seimas elections in 2016 it is represented in the parliament, and has further representatives at the municipal level.

History 

The party was established in 2012, emerging from a movement protesting alleged corruption in Lithuanian justice system, after the dismissal of the head of Financial Crime Investigation Authority. The movement was also highly critical of the law and order institutions that had been involved in investigating a pedophilia scandal. The leader of the party is Darius Kuolys.

The party members initially participated in the creation of the Way of Courage party, but later split of and created a separate organization.

In the elections to the Seimas in October 2016, Aušra Maldeikienė was elected as the party's first representative in the parliament, in the single-seat constituency of Žirmūnai.

References

Political parties in Lithuania
Political parties established in 2003